Henne Kirkeby Kro is an inn (kro) in the village of  in Varde Municipality, Denmark. It was established in 1790 and since 2007 has been owned by Flemming Skouboe. The restaurant is managed by former chef Garrey Dawson and under chef Paul Cunningham was awarded a Michelin star in 2016 and a second in 2017.

History
Henne Kirkeby Kro was built in 1790. The nature painter Johannes Larsen often stayed there while painting birds at the nearby lake, . It was owned for three generations by the Beck Thomsen family, most recently by the chef Hans Beck Thomsen, who ran it from 1981 until 2007, when he sold it to the Danish multi-millionaire Flemming Skouboe. Skouboe closed the business until 2009 and renovated the inn to luxury standards, with interiors in a modern, "quasi-minimalist" style including bed covers by Paul Smith, armchairs by Hans Wegner and photographs by Astrid Kruse Jensen, and later added a new guest building, Hunters' Lodge, increasing the number of guest rooms by seven to twelve. A lunch restaurant, conference space, and a helicopter landing pad have also been added.

 the inn is owned by the Skouboe family as part of the Fænø Estate. It is open eight months a year, from Easter to mid-December, and has 22 employees during the season.

Restaurant
The manager of the restaurant is Garrey Dawson, like Cunningham a British-born chef. Under chef Hans Beck Thomsen, it won the national restaurant award from Den danske Spiseguide in 2001, and the following year Jacob Justesen was chosen sommelier of the year. In 2009 Allan Poulsen was hired as chef; under him, in 2011 it again won the national award and in 2012 it was chosen Scandinavian restaurant of the year. Cunningham succeeded Poulsen as chef that year. The restaurant was awarded its first Michelin star in 2016 and a second in 2017.

The restaurant has twelve tables. The inn raises its own lamb, pigs, chicken and rabbits, and has the largest kitchen garden in Denmark, including an orchard and beehives. It also receives wild game from Skouboe's private island, Fænø, and is near Hvide Sande, the country's primary fish market. Poulsen's cuisine was new Nordic; in two dinner menus, 'Ma Cuisine' and 'Dinner chez nous', Cunningham serves an eclectic, classically-based cuisine emphasising the fresh ingredients, and fish and chips on Fridays.

Media
In 2015 the photographer Per Nagel published a book on the inn, Henne Kirkeby Kro: Exploring Taste and Senses.

In October 2016 the restaurant was featured in a broadcast of the documentary TV series Indefra med Anders Agger.

References

External links
Official website (English version)

Hotels in Denmark
Buildings and structures in Varde Municipality
Thatched buildings in Denmark
Hotel buildings completed in 1790
Michelin Guide starred restaurants in Denmark
Varde Municipality